was a Japanese painter, printmaker, illustrator, sculptor, ceramist, novelist, and film director from Nagano Prefecture.

Awards
Ikeda won the Akutagawa Prize for Offering In The Aegean (Eegekai ni sasagu).

Museum
The Ikeda Masuo Art Museum, named after Ikeda, is located in Nagano.

External links
 Ikeda Masuo Art Museum

Japanese printmakers
Japanese illustrators
Japanese ceramists
Japanese film directors
People from Nagano Prefecture
1934 births
1997 deaths
Akutagawa Prize winners
20th-century Japanese novelists
20th-century Japanese sculptors
20th-century Japanese painters
Japanese contemporary artists
20th-century printmakers
20th-century ceramists
21st-century ceramists